The Austria national beach soccer team represents Austria in international beach soccer competitions and is controlled by the ÖFB, the governing body for football in Austria.

Current squad
Correct as of January 2011

Coach: Gustav Stieglitz

Achievements
FIFA Beach Soccer World Cup qualification (UEFA) Best: Group stage
2009, 2011

References

External links
BSWW Profile

European national beach soccer teams
Beach Soccer